In Our Prime is a 2022 South Korean drama film directed by Park Dong-hoon. The film stars Choi Min-sik, Kim Dong-hwi, Park Byung-eun, Park Hae-joon and Jo Yun-seo and revolves around two people: a genius mathematician with a hidden past and a student who is failing math. 

It was released theatrically on March 9, 2022.

Premise
Lee Hak-seong (Choi Min-sik), a genius mathematician who defected from North Korea in search of academic freedom, hid his identity and story. He lives as a security guard at a private high school where the top 1% of gifted children gather. One day, Lee Hak-seong, who is the number one target to be avoided by students due to his cold and blunt expression, meets Han Ji-woo (Kim Dong-hwi), a high school student who gave up mathematics begging him to teach him mathematics after learning his identity. While teaching Han Ji-woo — who was wandering in a world looking only for the correct answer — how to find the correct solution process, Lee Hak-seong also encounters an unexpected turning point in his life.

Cast
 Choi Min-sik as Lee Hak-sung
 Kim Dong-hwi as Han Ji-woo
 Park Byung-eun as Kim Geun-ho
 Park Hae-joon as An Gi-cheol
 Jo Yun-seo as Park Bo-ram
 Tang Jun-sang as Lee Tae-yeon, son of Lee Hak-sung
 Kim Won-hae
 Joo Jin-mo
 Kang Mal-geum as Han Ji-woo's mother

Reception

Box office
, the film has a gross of US$4,081,864, and 534,287 admissions.

Awards and nominations

References

External links
 
 
 

2020s high school films
2022 drama films
2022 films
2020s South Korean films
2020s Korean-language films
South Korean drama films
South Korean high school films
Films about mathematics
Films about North Korean defectors
Films about students
Films set in Baden-Württemberg
Films set in South Korea
Films shot in Daejeon
Films shot in Gyeonggi Province
Films shot in North Jeolla Province
Films shot in Seoul
Showbox films
Films postponed due to the COVID-19 pandemic